The 2019 Canadian Curling Club Championships was held from November 25 to 30 at the Leduc Curling Club in Leduc, Alberta.

In the Men's final, Paul Moffatt's rink from the Kitchener-Waterloo Granite Club in Ontario defeated the Jasmin Gibeau rink from the Club de Curling Thurso in Quebec 10–5 to claim the title. It was the KW Granite Club's first victory at the Club Championships. In the bronze medal game, Northern Ontario's Ben Mikkelsen rink from the Port Arthur Curling Club shut out the Tyler Williams rink from the Whitehorse Curling Club in Yukon 12–0.

In the Women's final, Alberta's Nanette Dupont rink from the Lethbridge Curling Club defeated Nova Scotia's Tanya Phillips rink from the CFB Halifax Curling Club 9–4 to win the gold medal. It was a second championship for Dupont as she won the title in 2010. In the bronze medal game, Quebec's Isabelle Néron rink from the Club de Curling Chicoutimi beat the Peggy Dorosz rink from the Whitehorse Curling Club in Yukon 9–5.

Men

Teams
The teams are listed as follows:

Round-robin standings
Final round-robin standings

Round-robin results

All draws are listed in Eastern Time (UTC−04:00).

Draw 1
Monday, November 25, 4:00 pm

Draw 2
Monday, November 25, 8:30 pm

Draw 3
Tuesday, November 26, 10:00 am

Draw 4
Tuesday, November 26, 2:00 pm

Draw 5
Tuesday, November 26, 6:00 pm

Draw 6
Wednesday, November 27, 10:00 am

Draw 7
Wednesday, November 27, 2:00 pm

Draw 8
Wednesday, November 27, 6:00 pm

Draw 9
Thursday, November 28, 8:30 am

Draw 10
Thursday, November 28, 12:30 pm

Draw 11
Thursday, November 28, 4:30 pm

Draw 12
Thursday, November 28, 8:30 pm

Championship round

Source:

A Bracket

B Bracket

A Event

Semifinals
Friday, November 29, 9:00 am

Finals
Friday, November 29, 2:00 pm

B Event

Semifinals
Friday, November 29, 2:00 pm

Finals
Friday, November 29, 7:00 pm

Playoffs

Semifinals
Saturday, November 30, 9:00 am

Bronze medal game
Saturday, November 30, 2:00 pm

Final
Saturday, November 30, 2:00 pm

Women

Teams
The teams are listed as follows:

Round-robin standings
Final round-robin standings

Round-robin results

All draws are listed in Eastern Time (UTC−04:00).

Draw 1
Monday, November 25, 4:00 pm

Draw 2
Monday, November 25, 8:30 pm

Draw 3
Tuesday, November 26, 10:00 am

Draw 4
Tuesday, November 26, 2:00 pm

Draw 5
Tuesday, November 26, 6:00 pm

Draw 6
Wednesday, November 27, 10:00 am

Draw 7
Wednesday, November 27, 2:00 pm

Draw 8
Wednesday, November 27, 6:00 pm

Draw 9
Thursday, November 28, 8:30 am

Draw 10
Thursday, November 28, 12:30 pm

Draw 11
Thursday, November 28, 4:30 pm

Draw 12
Thursday, November 28, 8:30 pm

Championship round

Source:

A Bracket

B Bracket

A Event

Semifinals
Friday, November 29, 9:00 am

Finals
Friday, November 29, 2:00 pm

B Event

Semifinals
Friday, November 29, 2:00 pm

Finals
Friday, November 29, 7:00 pm

Playoffs

Semifinals
Saturday, November 30, 9:00 am

Bronze medal game
Saturday, November 30, 2:00 pm

Final
Saturday, November 30, 2:00 pm

References

External links

Curling Club Championship
Canadian Curling Club Championship
Canadian Curling Club
Curling in Alberta
Leduc, Alberta
Canadian Curling Club Championships